Shiraz University of Medical Sciences (SUMS) is a public medical school located in Shiraz, Iran.  It is ranked as one of Iran's top medical schools, with more than 9000 students studying in over 200 different disciplines, and a  faculty staff of nearly 900 and 25,000 personnel. as it is one of the best medical universities in Iran. Iranian students are recruited to SUMS through National Entrance Exam (Konkur) and registered to the main campus of the university. Shiraz University of Medical Sciences (SUMS), exhibiting nearly 70 years of Medical education experience, is the most popular University of Medical Sciences in southern Iran, and offers international degree and non-degree programs to international students at different levels and disciplines including Doctor of Medicine (M.D.), Doctor of Dental Medicine (D.M.D.), Doctor of Pharmacy (Pharm.D.), B.Sc., M.Sc.,Ph.D., Specialty, Subspecialty, and Fellowship.
International applicants who are interested to apply to SUMS' International Programs may apply at http:// www.gsia.sums.ac.ir.

With 41 hospitals (including 14 teaching hospitals), SUMS is a regional health care provider and the main medical center in Fars Province.

History
The Foundation of Shiraz University of Medical Sciences(SUMS) dates back to about 70 years ago when Shiraz Institute of Higher Health Education admitted a few medical students (1945). The High Institute of Health developed into Medical Faculty in 1946. The medical school is  located in central Shiraz, which was founded in 1946 as a college within Pahlavi University.  In 1953, a Faculty of Nursing was added, followed by a Faculty of Dentistry in 1969.  After the 1979 Islamic Revolution overthrew the Pahlavi dynasty, drastic changes were implemented at all universities.  The name of Pahlavi University was immediately changed to Shiraz University.  In 1986, the Iranian Ministry of Health, Treatment and Medical Education took over the departments and faculties in the medical sciences and SUMS became an independent institution.

Statistics
Shiraz University of Medical Sciences (SUMS), founded in 1946, is one of the oldest medical universities nationwide. Shiraz University of Medical Sciences was first established as the "Institute of Health for Higher Education". This institute was turned into the Faculty of Medicine in 1949.  "Nemazee Higher Institute for Nursing" and the School of Dentistry were founded in 1954 and 1970 respectively. Afterwards, other schools were shaped gradually.
All public higher educational schools in Shiraz (medical and non-medical) were initially under the auspices of Shiraz University – former "Pahlavi University". In 1986 education of medical sciences in Iran was taken over by the "Ministry of Health, Treatment and Medical Education" with the purpose of utilizing national medical resources more desirably in addition to promoting healthcare as well as medical teaching and research. Consequently, all medical faculties and centers continued their activities under the new affiliation; "Shiraz University of Medical Sciences (SUMS)". Non-medical programs, however, are still offered under the supervision of Shiraz University.
Shiraz University of Medical Sciences (SUMS) is not only responsible for training students in medical areas, but also manages all public hospitals, clinics and healthcare centers in Fars Province in southern Iran. The private sector of health system in Fars is also under the surveillance of SUMS. 
The following feature SUMS:
17 Schools
63 Research centers
41 Public Hospitals (including 14 teaching hospitals)
6 Research Incubators
 
Over 900 faculty members and more than 25000 personnel are working at SUMS in different areas including health, treatment, research and education. Currently, over 9000 students are studying in a variety of academic disciplines at SUMS schools and research centers. Iranian students are recruited to SUMS through National Entrance Exam (Konkur), whereas non-Iranian international applicants who would like to apply to SUMS are required to apply online after going through our A-Z program list. At SUMS, we have been capable of providing an intellectual environment to educate top students and send them out to practice their skills all over the world.
 
SUMS displays a good deal of tradition as well as modernity, aiming at training students, utilizing high-quality education and research. Since its foundation, SUMS has been active as one of the largest and most reputable universities in Iran and the Middle East and an influential figure in the region, regarding the services it offers to the students as well as the patients. SUMS is particularly proud of being considered by  the Iran Ministry of Health, Treatment and Medical Education as the main hub of four scientific areas as follows:
- The hub of liver transplantation
- The hub of clinical immunology 
- The hub of clinical Microbiology 
- The hub of advanced electronic learning
 
SUMS is also one of the main centers for cochlear implant Iran. Not only does it host hundreds of patients from southern Iran, it is also a well-known pivot for health tourism in Iran attracting hundreds of patients from nearby countries each year. Some of specific medical services which attracts patients to Shiraz include:

- Organ transplantation
- Cochlear implantation
- Cardiovascular angiography
- Hepatic angiography
- Cancer radiation-therapy and chemotherapy
- Different types of Eye surgery
- Different types of heart surgery
- Different types of orthopedic surgery
- Fetal Surgery
- Treatment of infertility by means of IVF technology

University Bodies
Shiraz University of Medical Sciences mainly aims at training talents through scientific education, research, and expansion of medical and paramedical sciences in order to supply the specialist staff required in the country, setting research and educational facilities to recognize potentialities and enhance the scientific capacity in relation to health and treatment issues and expanding health and treatment facilities throughout the society through affiliated health and treatment organizations and centers. University Authorities have played a crucial role in achieving these goals. Based on the first term of administration regulations for the universities and higher education institutes, the authorities of the university are as follows:
 
1.     Board of Trustees
2.     University Council
3.     Board of Directors
4.     Board of Auditors
5.     University Specialized Councils
 
The following table represents university authorities and their responsibilities:

Faculties  

 Faculty of Medicine,	1949
 Faculty of Dentistry,	1969
 Faculty of Pharmacy,	1990
 Faculty of Health, 1973 as Kavar College of Health and then, in 1984, as Faculty of Health in Shiraz
 Shiraz Hazrat-e-Fatemeh Nursing and Midwifery Faculty, 1953 as Nursing Education Center and then, in 1976, as Nursing Faculty
 Faculty of Paramedical Sciences, 1987
 Faculty of Rehabilitation,	1977
 Faculty of Nursing and Midwifery
 Faculty of Health and Health Sciences Research Center
 Faculty of Nutrition and Food Sciences
 Faculty of Paramedical Sciences
 Faculty of Management and Medical Information Sciences
 Faculty of Advanced Medical Sciences and Technologies

Notable alumni
Ali Asghar Khodadoust, Professor of Ophthalmology, originator of the Khodadoust line method
Gholam A. Peyman, inventor of LASIK. Peyman has received the National Medal of Technology and Innovation (2012). He was named a fellow of the National Academy of Inventors in 2013. 
Kamran Bagheri Lankarani, former Minister of Health and Medical Education of Iran

See also
Higher education in Iran
Shiraz University

External links

Official website
 International Students Admission at Shiraz University of Medical Sciences

Universities in Iran
Medical schools in Iran
Education in Shiraz
Educational institutions established in 1949
1949 establishments in Iran
Buildings and structures in Shiraz